Gerson Rodrigues is the name of:

Gerson Rodrigues (footballer, born 1988), Dutch footballer
Gerson Rodrigues (footballer, born 1995), footballer from Luxembourg
Gérson Rodrigues Andreotti, Brazilian footballer